Tyrone Garfield Kersey (April 7, 1949 – January 25, 2005), known as Ron "Have Mercy" Kersey, was an American keyboardist, songwriter, producer and arranger most known for writing the music to "Disco Inferno" by The Trammps.

Kersey was born in Philadelphia, Pennsylvania. He attended and graduated from Edison High School where he sang in the glee club and played football. He was a lifelong football fan and loved his Philadelphia Eagles. Kersey served in the United States Air Force from 1967 through 1972. While in the service he often played piano and keyboards at the local boards. There is where he gained the nickname "have mercy". It was the name the patrons would scream at him as he played because they loved his funky rhythms. Upon returning to Philadelphia, he re-acquainted himself with his longtime friend and musician Norman Harris. Norman was instrumental in Kersey becoming a studio musician at Sigma Sound Studios. He later became a member of the disco band The Trammps. Kersey did not like the constant travel so he decided to quit the band and concentrate on producing and writing. In 1978 he received a Grammy Award as producer for the soundtrack to Saturday Night Fever which included "Disco Inferno", which he co-wrote with Leroy Green. He was also a member of MFSB and the Salsoul Orchestra. He moved to Los Angeles in 1980 and continued his career as a sought after studio musician, producer and songwriter. Kersey suffered a stroke in 1997 and died in Philadelphia in 2005.

In addition to co-writing "Disco Inferno", Kersey produced or co-wrote songs that reached the top 20 for other artists. He produced Stephanie Mills’ "I Have Learned to Respect the Power of Love" which charted at number #1 for two weeks on the R&B charts. It was Mills’ first number one single and would prove to be her most successful single. Ron Kersey was also the producer for her next single "If I Were Your Woman", a cover of the Gladys Knight and the Pips hit that reached number #1 for three weeks on the R&B charts for Stephanie Mills. In addition, he co-wrote "Every Drop of Your Love" for Stacy Lattisaw that peaked at #8 on the R&B charts. He co-wrote the classic slow jam "Send for Me" with his friend Sam Dees for Atlantic Starr which peaked at #16. For Evelyn "Champagne" King, he co-wrote "Kisses Don’t Lie" with Alex Brown peaking at #17 on the R&B charts. Kersey also appears on many Philadelphia International Records as a studio musician most notably Teddy by Teddy Pendergrass, Unmistakably Lou by Lou Rawls and Message in the Music by The O'Jays.

References

External links 
 
 Ron Kersey at Soulwalking.co.uk
 

1949 births
2005 deaths
American disco musicians
American music arrangers
20th-century American keyboardists
American organists
20th-century American pianists
Record producers from Pennsylvania
Songwriters from Pennsylvania
Musicians from Philadelphia
Grammy Award winners
MFSB members
The Trammps members